Tanzanonautes tuerkayi is a species of fossil freshwater crab from Tanzania, the only species in the genus Tanzanonautes. It is the oldest known freshwater crab, and probably dates from the Oligocene; the next oldest specimens are from the Miocene. A number of fragmentary remains were discovered in the Songwe Valley part of the East African Rift in Mbeya Region, Tanzania (approximately ), in fragile sandstone sediments. The genus name refers to Tanzania, the country where the fossil was found, while the specific epithet commemorates Michael Türkay, an authority on freshwater crabs. The genus Tanzanonautes is assigned to the family Potamonautidae, although the characters mentioned in the family's diagnosis are missing from the fragmentary fossils available.

References

Potamoidea
Freshwater crustaceans of Africa
Fauna of East Africa
Fossil taxa described in 2007
Oligocene crustaceans
Prehistoric Malacostraca
Prehistoric crustacean genera
Monotypic arthropod genera